The 1983 Asian Basketball Confederation Championship for Men were held in Hong Kong from November 20 to November 29, 1983. Queen Elizabeth Stadium and Queen Elizabeth II Youth Centre were used for this tournament.

Preliminary round

Group A

Group B

Group C

Group D

 The Philippines originally beat Kuwait 78–57 and India 90–60 and topped the group but Asian Basketball Confederation cancelled the results on November 23, 1983 and declared naturalized players Jeff Moore and Dennis Still ineligible due to lack of residency.

Second round

Classification 13th–15th

Classification 9th–12th

Classification 5th–8th

 Jordan were relegated to 8th place after their team returned home on 26 November, and subsequently failed to appear for their match against Iran.

Championship

Final round

3rd place

Final

Final standing

Awards

Most Valuable Player:  Guo Yonglin
All-Star Team:
  Guo Yonglin
  Lee Chung-hee

References
 Results
 archive.fiba.com

Asia Championship, 1983
1983
B
1983 in Hong Kong sport
November 1983 sports events in Asia